Thank You is the second studio album by English singer Declan Galbraith. It was released on 1 December 2006 in Germany by Starwatch Music.

It is Galbraith's second album, a compilation of covers of classic songs assembled and sung by Galbraith.

Track listing
 "An Angel" (The Kelly Family) – 3:44
 "Love of My Life" (Freddie Mercury "Queen") – 2:36
 "Nights in White Satin" (The Moody Blues) – 3:47
 "Tears in Heaven" (Eric Clapton) – 4:27
 "Bright Eyes" (Art Garfunkel) – 3:51
 "House of the Rising Sun" (The Animals) – 3:18
 "Saved by the Bell" (Robin Gibb) – 3:22
 "David's Song (Who'll Come with Me)" (The Kelly Family) – 3:19
 "All Out of Love" (Air Supply)– 3:42
 "How Could an Angel Break My Heart?" (Toni Braxton) – 4:17
 "Vincent (Starry, Starry Night)" (Don McLean)– 4:03
 "Only One Woman" (The Marbles) – 3:11
 "The Last Unicorn" (America) – 3:27
 "Sailing" (Gavin Sutherland) – 4:25
 "Where Did Our Love Go" (The Supremes) – 2:19
 "World [iTunes and USA edition Bonus Track]" (the Bee Gees) – 3:33

Charts

Weekly charts

Year-end charts

Singles
 "Love of My Life" Released on 23 March 2007.

References

Declan Galbraith albums
2006 albums
Covers albums